The National Leprechaun Museum is a privately owned museum dedicated to Irish folklore and mythology, through the oral tradition of storytelling. It is located on Jervis Street in Dublin, Ireland, since 10 March 2010. It claims to be the first leprechaun museum in the world. The Irish Times has referred to it as the "Louvre of leprechauns".

Tom O'Rahilly designed the museum (with the collaboration of two Italian designers, Elena Micheli and Walter Scipioni) and is its director. O'Rahilly began working on his museum in 2003. He views it as a "story-telling" tourist attraction designed to give visitors "the leprechaun experience" and introduce visitors to Ireland's rich storytelling history.

Visitors to the museum follow a guided tour involving several different rooms; each serving as sets for the stories and information. The basics of Leprechaun folklore are explained, including what it is that defines a leprechaun. A history of leprechaun references in popular culture is included, such as Walt Disney's visit to Ireland which led to his 1959 film Darby O'Gill and the Little People. There is a tunnel full of optical illusions, a wooden replica of the Giant's Causeway in County Antrim, Northern Ireland and a room where items such as furniture become unusually large to give the effect that the visitor has become smaller in size.

References to other creatures are included in the tour such as the púca, fairies, banshee and many more. At the end of the tour visitors arrive at a shop where they can purchase souvenirs and merchandise.

References

External links
 
 
 
 

Museums established in 2010
Folk museums in Europe
Leprechaun Museum
Leprechaun
Irish folklore
Museums in Dublin (city)
2010 establishments in Ireland